Megan McLean (born February 19, 1997) is a singer, songwriter, recording artist, and performer from Snohomish, Washington. McLean and her band perform a mix of guitar-driven country/grunge originals and covers of new-country favorites. McLean is known for her American country-rock-grunge (crunge) sound.

McLean's first single, as well as her new album, was recorded at London Bridge Studio by Geoff Ott in Shoreline, Washington, with Ben Smith of Heart on the drums, Brad Smith from Blind Melon on bass, and featured Shohei Ogami on guitar.

McLean is best known for her breakout single track titled "It's My Truck" which was released in 2015, and was awarded Country Pick of the Week in 2016. She also released her "Virtually Me" virtual reality app at the 94.1 KMPS pop-up show Taylor Swift concert in Seattle.

Early life and influences 

McLean was born to John and Leslea McLean and is one of two girls, who with her younger sister was raised in Snohomish, Washington, and attended Glacier Peak High School.

Career 

McLean started out as an actress, starring in Canna, a short film, in 2013.

In 2015 McLean released her first single titled "It's My Truck" featuring a production team including Ben Smith (Heart), Brad Smith (Blind Melon), Jeff Balding, and Andrew Mendleson. Her single was recorded at London Bridge Studio in Seattle, Washington, known for recording acts such as Nirvana, Pearl Jam, Nickelback, 3 Doors Down, Macklemore, among others. Her songs are produced by Geoff Ott. There was a making-of video produced by Todd and Jackson of Turn Left Productions. McLean was the first artist to have her likeness etched into the vintage Neve 8048 recording console at London Bridge Studio.

In 2016 McLean released Out of School also recorded at London Bridge Studio. In 2017, McLean re-released "Don't Speak" from the EP as a single in 2017 with a music video.

In 2018 she began opening for larger acts such as Lorrie Morgan, Pam Tillis, Clint Black and Sara Evans. Then, in 2019 she released a single, "Frisky", out of London Bridge Studio.

Personal life 

McLean attended college at the University of Montana where she was a member of the Griz rodeo team. She dropped out to pursue music when she was offered an exclusive deal with ReelTime. She is involved in barrel racing and gymkhana locally in Snohomish, Washington.

In 2016 McLean began to shine a light on Local Animal Rescue organizations in the Seattle area such as Emerald City Pet Rescue. In her video of the event on YouTube she stated "I really admire the work you guys do here, it has always been a dream of mine to start Megs Animal Rescue Shelter and call it M.A.R.S for short."

References

External links 
 

1997 births
Musicians from Seattle
American actresses
Living people
21st-century American singers
21st-century American women